Neon Nights is an album by Dannii Minogue.

Neon Night or Neon Nights may also refer to:

Neon Nights: 30 Years of Heaven & Hell, a 2010 live album by Heaven & Hell
Neon Nights Electric Lives, a 2005 album by Vermont band The Static Age
"Neon Nights", a song by German heavy metal band Accept on their album Restless and Wild
The Lia Show, a syndicated country music and entertainment variety show on the radio formerly known as Neon Nights